Tenen Holtz (born Alex Elihu Tenenholtz; February 17, 1887 – July 1, 1971) was an American actor. He appeared in nearly 60 films between 1926 and 1961.

Biography
Holtz was born in Imperial Russia, and came to the United States when he was seven years old. While he was in elementary school, he began working, but he pursued studies in evening high school to improve his language abilities. Jacob Pavlovich Adler observed Holtz performing in a school production and not only gave him a permanent pass to Adler's playhouse but also allowed him to attend rehearsals.<ref name="laep">{{cite news |title=Noted Yiddish Actor in 98' |url=https://www.newspapers.com/clip/99838550/tenen-holtz/ |access-date=April 16, 2022 |work=Los Angeles Evening Post |date=May 29, 1928 |page=5|via = Newspapers.com}}</ref>

His first appearance in amateur Yiddish theatre plays occurred in 1903 in the staged readings of the works of Yiddish author Sholom Aleichem. In July 1926, he went to California "to see what all these pictures were about", he said. His film debut came in Upstage.

Holtz's final television appearance was as murder victim Otto Joseph in the 1964 Perry Mason episode, "The Case of the Arrogant Arsonist". He died in Los Angeles County, California in 1971, aged 84.

Holtz married Ethel Fishman, and they had a daughter, Naomi, who married Nelson Riddle.

Selected filmography

 Upstage (1926)
 Exit Smiling (1926)
 Long Pants (1927)
 The Demi-Bride (1927)
 Frisco Sally Levy (1927)
 The Trail of '98 (1928)
 Detectives (1928)
 The Cardboard Lover (1928)
 Old Gray Hoss (1928)
 Bringing Up Father (1928)
 Noisy Noises (1929)
 The Duke Steps Out (1929)
 House of Horror (1929)
 Three Live Ghosts (1929)
 Lilies of the Field (1930)
 The Melody Man (1930)
 The Woman Racket (1930)
 Caught Cheating (1931)
 Three Girls Lost (1931)
 Faithless (1932)
 Whistling in the Dark (1933)
 Money Means Nothing (1934)
 British Agent (1934)
 Cipher Bureau'' (1938)

References

External links

1887 births
1971 deaths
American male film actors
American male silent film actors
Jewish American male actors
Emigrants from the Russian Empire to the United States
20th-century American male actors